The 2012 FIA World Endurance Championship was the inaugural running of the World Endurance Championship. It was co-organised by the Fédération Internationale de l'Automobile (FIA) and the Automobile Club de l'Ouest (ACO).  The series replaced the former Intercontinental Le Mans Cup held by the ACO from 2010 to 2011.  The series was open to Le Mans Prototypes and grand tourer-based racing cars meeting four ACO categories.  Several championships, cups, and trophies were awarded in the series' four categories following an eight race season, with a World Championship available to the top scoring drivers and LMP1 category manufacturer.

Following a partial-season match-up against newcomers Toyota, Audi won the Manufacturers' World Championship, while the company's driver line-up of André Lotterer of Germany, Benoît Tréluyer of France, and Marcel Fässler of Switzerland earned the Drivers' World Championship ahead of their teammates Allan McNish and Tom Kristensen.  Toyota's Alexander Wurz and Nicolas Lapierre were third in the Drivers' Championship standings.  Ferrari defending their two Intercontinental Le Mans Cup LMGTE manufacturers title with the Manufacturers' World Cup, outscoring Porsche and Corvette.  In the four FIA Trophies for the four categories in the championship, Rebellion Racing won the LMP1 Privateers title, while Starworks Motorsport secured the LMP2 championship; AF Corse won the LMGTE Pro category for the second season in a row, as did Larbre Compétition in LMGTE Am.

Calendar

An initial calendar was announced on 12 November 2011, featuring eight races in eight countries on four continents.  Sebring, Spa-Francorchamps, Le Mans, and Silverstone are retained from the 2011 Intercontinental Le Mans Cup, while the Chinese round remained undecided between 2011's Zhuhai International Circuit or the Shanghai International Circuit.  Three new races at the Autódromo José Carlos Pace, Bahrain International Circuit, and Fuji Speedway expand the series to a new continent, replacing the former ILMC round for the Petit Le Mans.  A revised calendar released on 7 December swapped the dates of the events in Bahrain and Fuji, while ACO confirmed on 2 February that the final round would be hosted in Shanghai, with the date moved to 27 October.  All races were timed events. The 12 Hours of Sebring was a joint event with competitors from the American Le Mans Series sharing half of the race grid, but not scoring points in the World Championship.

Entries
The World Endurance Championship received entries in four classes, including Le Mans Prototype 1 (LMP1), Le Mans Prototype 2 (LMP2), Le Mans Grand Touring Endurance — Professional (LMGTE Pro) and Le Mans Grand Touring Endurance — Amateur (LMGTE Am). The entry list for the 2012 season was released by the Automobile Club de l'Ouest on 2 February, and included nine LMP1 and LMP2 cars, five LMGTE Pro entries, and seven LMGTE Am cars, bringing the full grid up to thirty entrants.  Additional entries from full-season teams were also allowed over the course of the season, with a maximum of three cars per entrant.

LMP1

LMP2

LMGTE Pro

LMGTE Am

Results and standings

Race results
The highest finishing competitor entered in the World Endurance Championship is listed below.  Invitational entries may have finished ahead of WEC competitors in individual races.

Championships
Entries were required to complete the timed race as well as to complete 70% of the overall winning car's race distance in order to earn championship points.  A single bonus point was awarded to the team and all drivers of the pole position car in qualifying in each category.  For the 24 Hours of Le Mans, the points allocation was doubled.

Drivers' World Championship

André Lotterer, Benoît Tréluyer and Marcel Fässler won the Drivers' World Championship at the 6 Hours of Shanghai.  They had won three races including the 24 Hours of Le Mans driving the No.1 car of Audi Sport Team Joest.

Notes
† — Drivers were classified, but did not score as they drove for less than the required minimum time during the race.

Manufacturers' World Championship

The FIA LMP1 Manufacturers' World Endurance Championship was open to full-season manufacturer entries participating in the LMP1 category. Points were only awarded to the highest scoring entry for that manufacturer for each event. Further, only the scores from six events counted towards the championship, Le Mans plus the five best race results over the season.  Audi secured the Manufacturers' World Championship at the 6 Hours of Silverstone following four consecutive victories in the first half of the championship.

Manufacturers' World Cup

The LMGTE Manufacturers' World Cup was open to full-season manufacturer entries participating in either of the two LMGTE categories. Results in the LMGTE Pro and LMGTE Am categories were combined for the World Cup. Only the two best classified cars of the same manufacturer in an event scored points for the World Cup. Ferrari secured the Manufacturers' World Cup title at the 6 Hours of Bahrain following four consecutive victories.

LMP1 Trophy

The FIA Endurance Trophy for LMP1 Teams was open to full-season privateer LMP1 entries not designated as manufacturers. Only the best classified car of a team at each event scored points for the Trophy. Rebellion Racing secured the LMP1 Trophy at the 6 Hours of Fuji, winning five of the first seven races in the season including five races with both team cars on the privateer podium.

LMP2 Trophy

Starworks Motorsport earned the LMP2 Trophy at the 6 Hours of Fuji, winning three races and earning four class pole positions.

LMGTE Pro Trophy

The LMGTE Pro Trophy was won by AF Corse, who secured the championship at the 6 Hours of Bahrain.  The team had finished every race of the season in either first or second place with either of their two Ferraris.

LMGTE Am Trophy

Larbre Compétition won the LMGTE Am Trophy at the 6 Hours of Shanghai, winning three races with either of their two  Chevrolet Corvettes.

References

External links

 

World Endurance Championship
 
FIA World Endurance Championship seasons